The Texas Conservative Coalition Research Institute (TCCRI) is a conservative think tank in Texas. It was founded in 1996 by state
legislators who had a vision to develop and implement conservative public
policies in state government. The group states that it "is committed to shaping public policy through a principled approach to state government." 

Texas State Senator Larry Taylor was selected as the group's chairman in February 2015. Jeff Sandefer sits on the organization's board.

The group has fought energy regulations in Texas and opposed stricter campaign finance disclosure limits.

References

External links
 
 Organizational Profile – National Center for Charitable Statistics (Urban Institute)
 
  

Think tanks based in the United States
Organizations based in Austin, Texas
Organizations established in 1996
1996 establishments in Texas